Juliana Sokolová (born 19. júl 1981 in Košice) is a Slovak writer, poet and philosopher.

Early life 
Juliana Sokolová grew up in Košice and Misrata. She studied Philosophy at the University of York graduating in 2009. During her studies, she lived partly in the UK, partly in Kosovo and Sarajevo. Since 2010, she has taught Aesthetics at the Technical University of Košice.

Works 
Sokolová writes in English, Slovak and occasionally in Hungarian. In 2013, she published a book of poems written in English and translated to Slovak My House will have a Roof / Môj dom bude mať strechu.

She has been involved in transformation of the Úsmev cinema in Košice into an important cultural centre.

References

Living people
1981 births
Alumni of the University of York
Slovak academics
Slovak philosophers
Slovak women poets
21st-century Slovak women writers
Writers from Košice